The 1965 Sudbury Municipal election was held on December 6, 1965. Max Silverman was elected Mayor of the City of Sudbury.

The candidates elected to Sudbury City Council were:

1965 Election results

The results of the 1965 municipal election were reported by the Sudbury Star on December 7, 1965.  The results are listed below:

References

1965
1965 elections in Canada
1965 in Ontario
December 1965 events in Canada